The Louis Tomlinson World Tour was the first concert tour by English singer Louis Tomlinson in support of his debut studio album Walls (2020). The tour began on 9 March 2020 in Barcelona but was postponed after two shows due to the COVID-19 pandemic until it restarted on 1 February 2022 in Dallas and concluded on 3 September 2022 in Milan.

Background and development
On 23 October 2019, Tomlinson announced via Twitter and his official website that he would be embarking on his first ever solo tour in support of his debut album, Walls (2020). Additional dates in New York City and Los Angeles were added on 31 October along with an additional date in London added on 1 November. Dates in Santiago and Mexico City were added on 25 November. Dates in Oakland and Moscow were added on 6 December. Additional date in Milan and dates in Palmanova and Rome were added on 29 January 2020. A date in Kyiv was added on 6 February 2020. A date in Scarborough was added on 10 February 2020. A date in Madrid was added on 4 March 2020. An additional date in Mexico City and dates in Guadalajara and Monterrey were added on 11 March 2020. 

On 27 February, Tomlinson announced Only The Poets, whom also opened Tomlinson's performance for BRITs week, as the supporting act for a majority of his first European leg. In March 2020, the 11 March show in Milan was cancelled, with the remaining March shows rescheduled to August and September of the same year, due to increased health concerns over the COVID-19 pandemic. In April 2020, the remaining dates for the first European leg were postponed, following continued concerns of the pandemic. In May, he postponed the North American dates of the tour. In July, Tomlinson announced that the tour would be postponed to 2021, amid the COVID-19 pandemic.

An additional date in New York was added on 31 July 2020. On 19 October of the same year, an additional date in Melbourne was added to the tour itinerary.

On 15 December 2020, UK and European dates have been rescheduled to August and September 2022, and new dates in Reykjavik, Oslo, Warsaw, Prague, Vienna and Zurich along with an additional date in Paris were added.

Set list
This set list is representative of the show on 10 March 2020 in Madrid. It is not intended to represent all concerts for the tour.

 "Just Hold On"
 "We Made It"
 "Don't Let It Break Your Heart"
 "Drag Me Down" 
 "Two of Us"
 "Habit"
 "Too Young" 
 "Perfect Now"
 "Through the Dark" 
 "7" 
 "Fearless"
 "Defenceless" 
 "Beautiful War" 
 "Always You"
 "Little Black Dress" 
 "Walls"
Encore
 "Only The Brave"
 "Kill My Mind"

Notes 
 Beginning with the show in Dallas, Tomlinson added "Copy of a Copy of a Copy", removed "Perfect Now" and re-arranged the order in which several songs were performed.

Tour dates

Notes

The score data is representative of the two shows at Roseland Theater on 4, 7 March respectively.

Cancelled shows

References

Citations

Notes

2020 concert tours
2022 concert tours
Concert tours postponed due to the COVID-19 pandemic